Leeman is a small coastal town in the Shire of Coorow in Western Australia.

Land was first surveyed and sub-divided in 1961 and the townsite was gazetted in 1961 as Snag Island, a name that is still in common use. Snag Island is a rocky island a small distance off-shore from the town.

The town was named after Abraham Leeman van Santwits, a Dutch sailor. Leeman was sent with a party of seven by captain Pieter Albertszoon to Batavia (now Jakarta) for help; they arrived there in June 1656. In 1658 Leeman returned as first officer on board Waeckende Boei in search of the wreckage. He was in charge of the shore party that was abandoned when a storm blew in. Leeman and his crew then took a six-month open boat voyage to Batavia via Java.

In 1971 the Western Australian Education department opened the Leeman Primary School, and the town adopted the new name.

The actress Mandy McElhinney grew up in a caravan park in Leeman.

There is a Leeman Football Club.

References

External links

Leeman Primary School

Coastal towns in Western Australia
Populated places established in 1961
Shire of Coorow